Wakulla County is a county located in the Big Bend region in the northern portion of the U.S. state of Florida. As of the 2020 census, the population was 33,764. Its county seat is Crawfordville.

Wakulla County is part of the Tallahassee, FL Metropolitan Statistical Area.

Wakulla County has a near-absence of any municipal population, with two small municipalities holding about 3% of the population. The county seat, Crawfordville, is one of only two unincorporated county seats among Florida's 67 counties.

History

First Spanish period 
In 1528, Pánfilo de Narváez found his way to what would be Wakulla County from the future Pinellas County, Florida, camping at the confluence of the Wakulla and St. Marks rivers. Narváez determined this was a very suitable spot for a fort. In 1539, Hernando de Soto's expedition passed through La Florida with a similar route.

The Fort San Marcos de Apalache began with a wooden fort in the late 1600s. The vicinity around the fort was not settled until 1733. Spanish colonial officials began constructing a stone fort, which was unfinished in the mid-1760s when Great Britain took over.

British period 
The British divided Florida into East Florida, which included present-day Wakulla County, and West Florida. The boundary was the Apalachicola River; at that time, West Florida extended all the way to the Mississippi River.  Twenty years later when the Spanish returned, they kept the East and West divisions, with the administrative capitals remaining at St. Augustine and Pensacola, respectively.

Second Spanish period
The area to become Wakulla County was an active place in the early 19th century. A former British officer named William Augustus Bowles attempted to unify and lead 400 Creek Indians against the Spanish outpost of San Marcos, capturing it. This provoked Spain, and a Spanish flotilla arrived some five weeks later to restore control.

In 1818, General Andrew Jackson invaded the area, capturing Fort San Marcos. Two captive British citizens, Robert Ambrister and Alexander Arbuthnot, were tried, found guilty of inciting Indian raids, and executed under Jackson's authority – causing a diplomatic nightmare between the U.S. and Britain. The U.S. Army garrison of 200 infantry and artillery men occupied the fort for the better part of a year (1818-1819).

In 1821, Florida was ceded to the United States and Fort St. Marks, as the Americans called it, was again garrisoned by U.S. troops.

Florida's territorial period 
In 1824, the fort was abandoned and turned over to the Territory of Florida.

By 1839, the fort was returned to the Federal government and a merchant marine hospital was built. The hospital provided care for seamen and area yellow fever victims.

American forts in Wakulla County 
 1840 - Camp Lawson, northwest of Wakulla and northeast of Ivan, on the St. Marks River. A log stockade also known as Fort Lawson (2).
 1841-1842 - Fort Many located near Wakulla Springs.
 1839 - Fort Number Five (M) located near Sopchoppy.
 1839-1843 - Fort Stansbury was located on the Wakulla River  from St. Marks.
 1841-1843 - Fort Port Leon. Abandoned after a hurricane destroyed it. Site was later used for a CSA Army artillery battery.
 1839 - James Island Post located on James Island.
Source: Florida Forts

Antebellum Wakulla 
Wakulla County was created from Leon County in 1843. It may (although this is disputed) be named for the Timucuan Indian word for "spring of water" or "mysterious water". This is in reference to Wakulla County's greatest natural attraction, Wakulla Springs, which is one of the world's largest freshwater springs, both in terms of depth and water flow.

In an 1856 book, adventurer Charles Lanman wrote of the springs:

Another possible origin for the name Wakulla, not as widely accepted, is that it means "mist" or "misting", perhaps in reference to the Wakulla Volcano, a 19th-century phenomenon in which a column of smoke could be seen emerging from the swamp for miles.

The town of Port Leon was once a thriving cotton-shipping hub, with a railroad from Tallahassee that carried over 50,000 tons of cotton a year to be put on ships, usually for shipment direct to Europe. Port Leon was the sixth-largest town in Florida, with 1,500 residents. However, a hurricane and the accompanying storm surge wiped out the entire town. New Port (today known as Newport, Florida) was built two miles (3 km) upstream but never quite achieved the prosperity of Port Leon.

Civil War 
During the Civil War, Wakulla County was blockaded from 1861 to 1865 by a Union Navy squadron at the mouth of the St. Marks River. Confederates took the old Spanish fort known as San Marcos de Apalache, or Fort St. Marks, and renamed it Fort Ward.

The Battle of Natural Bridge eventually stopped the Union force that intended to take Fort Ward and nearby Tallahassee, the only Confederate state capital other than Austin Texas which had not been captured. The Union was not able to land all of its forces, but they still outnumbered the Confederates, who chose to make their stand at a place where the St. Marks River goes underground: the "Natural Bridge" referred to. However, the Confederate Army had over a day to prepare its defenses, and the Union Army retreated. Most of the dead were African-American Union soldiers.

20th century & beyond 
In Gloria Jahoda's book, The Other Florida, she writes movingly of the extreme poverty of Wakulla County from the early 1900s to 1966, when Wakulla still had no doctor and no dentist, few stores, and a county newspaper produced just once a month on a mimeograph machine.

Today, Wakulla has several doctors and dentists, several supermarkets and big-box retailers, a golf resort, and a thriving seafood business.

Etymology 
The name Wakulla is corrupted from Guacara. Guacara is a Spanish phonetic spelling of an original Indian name, and Wakulla is a Muskhogean pronunciation of Guacara. The Spanish Gua is the equivalent of the Creek wa, and as the Creek alphabet does not exhibit an "R" sound, the second element cara would have been pronounced kala by the Creeks. The Creek voiceless "L" is always substituted for the Spanish "R". Thus the word Guacara was pronounced Wakala by the Seminoles who are Muskhogean in their origin and language.

Since Wakulla was probably a Timucuan word, it is unlikely that its meaning will ever be known.  It may contain the word kala which signified a "spring of water" in some Indian dialects.. It may also be a reference to the Whip-poor-will, known as  waxkula in Creek.

Geography 

Adjacent counties 
 Leon County - north
 Liberty County - west
 Franklin County - southwest
 Jefferson County - east

National protected areas 
 Apalachicola National Forest (part)
 St. Marks National Wildlife Refuge (part)

State and local protected areas 
 Ochlockonee River State Park
 San Marcos de Apalache Historic State Park
 Wakulla Springs State Park

Demographics

2020 census 

As of the 2020 United States census, there were 33,764 people, 11,382 households, and 8,362 families residing in the county.

2000 census 
As of the census of 2000, there were 22,863 people, 8,450 households, and 6,236 families residing in the county. There were 9,820 housing units at an average density of 16 per square mile (6/km2). The racial makeup of the county was 86.10% White, 11.51% Black or African American, 0.59% Native American, 0.25% Asian, 0.03% Pacific Islander, 0.29% from other races, and 1.23% from two or more races. 1.94% of the population were Hispanic or Latino of any race.

There were 8,450 households, out of which 35.60% had children under the age of 18 living with them, 57.10% were married couples living together, 12.40% had a female householder with no husband present, and 26.20% were non-families. 22.00% of all households were made up of individuals, and 7.00% had someone living alone who was 65 years of age or older. The average household size was 2.57 and the average family size was 2.99. In the county, the population was spread out, with 25.60% under the age of 18, 7.60% from 18 to 24, 31.70% from 25 to 44, 24.70% from 45 to 64, and 10.30% who were 65 years of age or older.  The median age was 37 years. For every 100 females, there were 107.30 males.  For every 100 females age 18 and over, there were 106.80 males.

The median income for a household in the county was $37,149, and the median income for a family was $42,222. Males had a median income of $29,845 versus $24,330 for females. The per capita income for the county was $17,678.  About 9.30% of families and 11.30% of the population were below the poverty line, including 15.40% of those under age 18 and 15.10% of those age 65 or over.

Politics

County representation

Transportation

Roads 
Although there are no Interstate highways in Wakulla County, several major routes pass through the area, including U.S. Route 98 and U.S. Route 319. Other important roads in the county include State Road 267, State Road 363 and County Road 375.

Railroads 
No railroads currently operate within Wakulla County.

In the past the Georgia, Florida and Alabama Railroad passed through Sopchoppy on its route between Tallahassee and Carrabelle until its abandonment in 1948; that portion of the line was referred to as the Sumatra Leaf Line, referring to a tobacco grown in the area. South of Sopchoppy the line followed H.T. Smith Road. The railroad bridge crossing the Ochlocknee River at MacIntyre still exists as pilings blocking all but a portion of the river on the south side. while the Tallahassee Railroad, the first railroad in Florida, was abandoned by its successor, the Seaboard Coast Line Railroad, in 1983.

Airports 
The Wakulla County Airport (2J0), located south of Panacea, is a small public-use airport with a single , north–south turf runway.

Seaports 
St. Marks is a small commercial seaport. Panacea and Ochlockonee Bay also support small fishing fleets.

Education 
Wakulla County is served by the Wakulla school district with the following schools:
 Crawfordville Elementary School
 C.O.A.S.T. Charter School
 Medart Elementary School
 Shadeville Elementary School
 Riversink Elementary School
 Riversprings Middle School
 Wakulla Middle School
 Wakulla High School
 Wakulla Christian School
The former Sopchoppy Elementary School now serves as the Sopchoppy Education Center, a Pre-K, adult, and second chance school.

The former Shadeville High School served African-American students from 1931 to 1967.

Library
The Wakulla County Public Library is the main library of Wakulla County and is a part of the Wilderness Coast Public Libraries.

Communities

Towns 
 Sopchoppy
 St. Marks

Census-designated places 
 Crawfordville
 Panacea

Other unincorporated communities 

 Arran
 Buckhorn
 Curtis Mills
 Hyde Park
 Ivan
 Medart
 Newport
 Port Leon
 Sanborn
 Shadeville
 Shell Point
 Smith Creek
 Spring Creek
 Wakulla
 Wakulla Beach

See also 
 National Register of Historic Places listings in Wakulla County, Florida
 Andrew Hargrett

Notes

References

Sources 

 Florida forts

 
Florida counties
Florida placenames of Native American origin
1843 establishments in Florida Territory
Populated places established in 1843
Tallahassee metropolitan area
Charter counties in Florida
North Florida